Diostracus is a genus of flies in the family Dolichopodidae.

Species
Subgenus Diostracus Loew, 1861:

Diostracus acutatus Wang, Wang & Yang, 2015
Diostracus albuginosus Wei & Liu, 1996
Diostracus alticola Saigusa, 1984
Diostracus angustipalpis Saigusa, 1984
Diostracus antennalis Takagi, 1968
Diostracus aristalis Saigusa, 1995
Diostracus aurifer Takagi, 1972
Diostracus auripalpis Saigusa, 1984
Diostracus auripilosus Saigusa, 1984
Diostracus baiyunshanus Yang & Saigusa, 1999
Diostracus bisinuatus Saigusa, 1995
Diostracus brevabdominalis Zhu, Masunaga & Yang, 2007
Diostracus brevicerus Yang & Saigusa, 2000
Diostracus brevis Yang & Saigusa, 2000
Diostracus burmanicus Saigusa, 1995
Diostracus campsicnemoides Grichanov, 2015
Diostracus chaetodactylus Saigusa, 1984
Diostracus clavatus Zhu, Yang & Masunaga, 2007
Diostracus dicercaeus Wei & Liu, 1996
Diostracus digitiformis Yang & Saigusa, 2000
Diostracus emeiensis Yang, 1998
Diostracus emotoi Saigusa, 1984
Diostracus fanjingshanensis Zhang, Yang & Masunaga, 2003
Diostracus fasciatus Takagi, 1968
Diostracus femoratus Saigusa, 1984
Diostracus fenestratus Saigusa, 1984
Diostracus flavipes Takagi, 1968
Diostracus flexus Takagi, 1972
Diostracus fulvispinatus Saigusa, 1984
Diostracus genualis Takagi, 1968
Diostracus gymnoscutellatus Saigusa, 1984
Diostracus henanus Yang, 1999
Diostracus impulvillatus Saigusa, 1984
Diostracus inornatus Takagi, 1968
Diostracus janssonorum Saigusa, 1995
Diostracus kimotoi Takagi, 1968
Diostracus lamellatus Wei & Liu, 1996
Diostracus latipennis Saigusa, 1995
Diostracus lii Zhang, Yang & Masunaga, 2003
Diostracus longicercus Zhu, Yang & Masunaga, 2007
Diostracus longicornis Saigusa, 1984
Diostracus longiunguis Saigusa, 1984
Diostracus maculatus Negrobov, 1980
Diostracus magnipalpis Saigusa, 1984
Diostracus makiharai Saigusa, 1984
Diostracus malaisei Saigusa, 1995
Diostracus mchughi Harmston, 1966
Diostracus miyagii Takagi, 1968
Diostracus morimotoi Saigusa & Masunaga, 1997
Diostracus naegelei Negrobov, 1978
Diostracus nakanishii Takagi, 1968
Diostracus nebulosus Takagi, 1972
Diostracus nepalensis Saigusa, 1984
Diostracus nigrilineatus Saigusa, 1984
Diostracus nigripes Strobl, 1898
Diostracus nigripilosus Saigusa, 1984
Diostracus nishidai Saigusa, 1984
Diostracus olga Aldrich, 1911
Diostracus parvipunctatus Saigusa, 1984
Diostracus parvus Saigusa, 1984
Diostracus pennilobatus Saigusa, 1984
Diostracus prasinus Loew, 1861
Diostracus pretiosus Saigusa, 1984
Diostracus prolongatus Yang & Saigusa, 2000
Diostracus pulchripennis Saigusa, 1984
Diostracus punctatus Takagi, 1968
Diostracus quadrisetosus Saigusa, 1984
Diostracus ramulosus Takagi, 1972
Diostracus reticulatus Saigusa, 1984
Diostracus rotundicornis Saigusa, 1984
Diostracus saigusai Takagi, 1968
Diostracus shimai Saigusa, 1984
Diostracus simplicipes Saigusa, 1984
Diostracus songxianus Yang & Saigusa, 1999
Diostracus subalpinus (Negrobov, 1973)
Diostracus tangalensis Saigusa, 1984
Diostracus tarsalis Takagi, 1968
Diostracus tibetensis Wang, Wang & Yang, 2015
Diostracus umbrinervis Saigusa, 1984
Diostracus undulatus Takagi, 1968
Diostracus unipunctatus Saigusa, 1984
Diostracus unisetosus Saigusa, 1984
Diostracus vitae Negrobov, 1980
Diostracus wolongensis Zhang, Yang & Masunaga, 2005
Diostracus yamamotoi Masunaga, 2000
Diostracus yatai Masunaga, 2000
Diostracus yukawai Takagi, 1968
Diostracus zlobini Negrobov, 1980

Subgenus Lagodechia Negrobov & Zurikov, 1996:
Diostracus filiformis Zhu, Masunaga & Yang, 2007
Diostracus kabaki Grichanov, 2017
Diostracus nishiyamai Saigusa, 1995 (Synonym: D. zhangjiajiensis Yang, 1998)
Diostracus spinulifer Negrobov & Tsurikov, 1988

Subgenus Ozmena Özdikmen, 2010 (= Takagia Negrobov, 1973 nec Matsumura, 1942):
Diostracus stackelbergi (Negrobov, 1965)

Subgenus Sphyrotarsus Mik, 1874:
Diostracus argyrostomus (Mik, 1874)
Diostracus kustovi Grichanov, 2013
Diostracus caucasicus (Negrobov, 1965)
Diostracus hervebazini (Parent, 1914)
Diostracus hessei (Parent, 1914)
Diostracus hygrophilus (Becker, 1891)
Diostracus leucostomus (Loew, 1861) (Synonym: D. nigripes Strobl, 1898)
Diostracus parenti (Hesse, 1933)

References 

Dolichopodidae genera
Hydrophorinae
Taxa named by Hermann Loew